Delphia Yachts is a yacht manufacturer based in Olecko, Poland. Delphia Yachts was established in 1990 by brothers Piotr and Wojciech Kot. With a production of more 150 units per year it is Poland's largest manufacturer of sailing boats. In June 2012 Delphia Yachts acquired Maxi yachts of Sweden.

In 2018 the company was acquired by French boat manufacturer Beneteau.

References

Further reading
  Delphia Yachts Kot: Żeglarska marka światowa | rp.pl
  Warsaw Business Journal - Online Portal - wbj.pl
  Delphia Yachts slow down | Nowy Puls Biznesu - rynek, akcje, spółka, przedsiębiorca, budżet

External links

 

Polish brands
Polish boat builders
Manufacturing companies established in 1990
1990 establishments in Poland